Cheiridopsis is a genus that consists of 100 species of flowering succulent perennial plants, native to semi-arid regions in the far west of Namibia and South Africa.

Description

Most species are clump-forming, a few are shrubby. The leaves are opposite and triangular in section, rarely flattened, the surface more or less velvety, which makes them easy to distinguish from species of the allied genus Argyroderma. Daisy-like flowers open during the day in summer, are borne singly and usually have yellow, rarely purple or red, petals.

The name comes from the Greek "cheiris", meaning "sleeve". Each succeeding pair of leaves differs from the previous one in form, size, and relative unity of the leaves. Those most united wither in the resting period and form a papery sheath covering the succeeding pair of leaves during dormancy in dry, hot summer.

Distribution
The genus occurs in the far west of South Africa and Namibia. Here it occurs from the Western Cape Province northwards through the Namaqualand, into Namibia.

Cultivation
The species are mostly adapted to a very arid, winter-rainfall climate. The tender species C. peculiaris requires cultivation under glass in temperate regions.

Species

References

Lord, Tony (2003) Flora : The Gardener's Bible : More than 20,000 garden plants from around the world. London: Cassell.  
Botanica Sistematica

 
Aizoaceae genera
Taxa named by N. E. Brown